The .577/500 No 2 Black Powder Express, also known as the 12.7mm British No 2, is a British centerfire fire rifle cartridge.

Development
The .577/500 No 2 BPE was developed as a black powder round some time before 1879 by necking down the .577 Black Powder Express to .507-inches (12.9 mm) for use in single or double rifles, as well as a variety of Martini-based lever rifles.

Like the .450 Black Powder Express, the .577/500 BPE came in several case lengths, the most common having a 3-inch case. A -inch variant would later be loaded with cordite to become the .577/500 Nitro Express.

For some time the .577/500 No 2 BPE was loaded with cordite to become the .577/500 No 2 Nitro for Black, the same cartridge loaded with mild loadings of cordite, carefully balanced through trial to replicate the ballistics of the Black powder version.

Use
The .577/500 No 2 BPE was a popular cartridge in India for hunting all thin-skinned game up to tiger. It didn't face competition from comparable .450 rounds there in the decades following 1907 due to the ban on British military calibres. Like the .500 Black Powder Express, the .577/500 No 2 BPE was never popular in Africa, not being powerful enough for thick-skinned game such as elephant.

Moderately popular in its day, the round has long since ceased to be offered commercially.

See also
Express (weaponry)
List of rifle cartridges
12mm caliber

References

Footnotes

Bibliography
 Barnes, Frank C, Cartridges of the World, ed 13, Gun Digest Books, Iola, 2012, .
 Wieland, Terry, Nitro Express: The Big Bang of the Big Bang, retrieved 20 Jun 16.

External links
 .577/500 No 2 Black Powder Express, cartridgecollector.net, retrieved 20 June 16.

Pistol and rifle cartridges
British firearm cartridges